Gerta Pohorylle (1 August 1910 – 26 July 1937), known professionally as Gerda Taro, was a German war photographer active during the Spanish Civil War. She is regarded as the first woman photojournalist to have died while covering the frontline in a war.

Taro was the companion and professional partner of photographer Robert Capa, who, like her, was Jewish. The name "Robert Capa" was originally an alias that Taro and Capa (born Endre Friedmann) shared, an invention meant to mitigate the increasing political intolerance in Europe and to attract the lucrative American market. Therefore, a significant amount of what is credited as Robert Capa's early work was actually created by Taro.

Early life
Gerta Pohorylle was born on 1 August 1910 in Stuttgart, Germany, to Gisela Boral and Heinrich Pohorylle, a middle-class Jewish family that had recently emigrated from East Galicia. She studied at Queen Charlotte High School (de), spent a year at a Lausanne boarding school, and later attended a business college.

In 1929, the family moved to Leipzig, just prior to the rise of Nazi Germany. Taro opposed the Nazi Party and became interested in Leftist politics. In 1933, following the Nazi party's coming to power, she was arrested and detained for distributing propaganda against the National Socialists. Eventually, the entire Pohorylle household was forced to leave Germany toward different destinations. Taro, age 23, headed for Paris, while her parents attempted to reach mandatory Palestine. Her brothers went to England. She would not see her family for the rest of her life.

Career

Taro's career was brief, but with great impact on photojournalism, especially in war. Hanno Hardt described her work with Robert Capa in the Spanish Civil war in this way: "Taro and Capa helped invent the genre of modern war photography while fueling the vicarious experience of the spectator by offering an approximation of life in the conflict zone."

Establishing the Robert Capa alias
When Pohorylle moved to Paris in 1934 to escape the anti-Semitism of Hitler's Germany she met the photojournalist Endre Friedmann, a Hungarian Jew, learned photography and became his personal assistant. They fell in love. Pohorylle began to work for Alliance Photo as a picture editor.

In 1936, Pohorylle received her first photojournalist credential. Then, she and Friedmann devised a plan where Friedmann claimed to be the agent of photographer Robert Capa, a name they invented. Both took news photographs and sold them as the work of the non-existent American photographer Robert Capa; a convenient name overcoming the increasing political intolerance prevailing in Europe and attractive for the lucrative American market. Capa was derived from Friedmann's Budapest street nickname "Cápa" which means "Shark" in Hungarian. The secret did not last long, but Friedmann kept the more commercial name "Capa" for his own name, while Pohorylle adopted the professional name of "Gerda Taro" after the Japanese artist Tarō Okamoto and Swedish actress Greta Garbo. The two worked together to cover the events surrounding the coming-to-power of the Popular Front in 1930s France.

Coverage of the Spanish Civil War

When the Spanish Civil War broke out in 1936, Taro travelled to Barcelona, Spain, to cover the events with Capa and David "Chim" Seymour. Taro acquired the nickname of La pequeña rubia ("The little blonde"). They covered the war together in northeastern Aragon and in the southern Córdoba province. Always together under the common and using the bogus signature of Robert Capa, they succeeded in publishing through important publications (the Swiss Zürcher Illustrierte, the French Vu). Their early war photographs are distinguishable since Taro used a Rollei camera which rendered squared photographs while Capa produced rectangular pictures using a Contax camera or a Leica camera. However, for some time in 1937 they each produced similar 35 mm pictures under the label of Capa&Taro.

Subsequently, Taro attained some independence. She refused Capa's marriage proposal. Also, she became publicly related to the circle of anti-fascist European and intellectuals (such as Ernest Hemingway and George Orwell) who crusaded particularly for the Spanish Republic. :fr:Ce Soir, a communist newspaper of France, signed her for publishing Taro's works only. Then, she began to commercialise her production under the Photo Taro label. Regards, Life, Illustrated London News and Volks-Illustrierte (the exile edition of Arbeiter-Illustrierte-Zeitung) were among the publications that used her work.

Reporting the Valencia bombing alone, Taro obtained the photographs which are her most celebrated. Also, in July 1937, Taro's photographs were in demand by the international press when, alone, she was covering the Brunete region near Madrid for Ce Soir. Although the Nationalist propaganda claimed that the region was under its control, the Republican forces had in fact forced that faction out. Taro's photographs were the only testimony of the actual situation.

Death

During her coverage of the Republican army retreat at the Battle of Brunete, Taro hopped onto the runningboard of General Walter's car that was carrying wounded soldiers. A Republican tank crashed into its side and Taro suffered critical wounds, dying the following day, 26 July 1937.

The circumstances of Taro's death have been questioned by British journalist Robin Stummer, writing in the New Statesman magazine. Stummer cited Willy Brandt, later Chancellor of West Germany, and a friend of Taro during the Spanish Civil War, saying that she had been the victim of the Stalinist purge of Communists and Socialists in Spain who were not aligned to Moscow. Taro was "warned by Willy Brandt in the summer of 1937 against working in Spain," yet she went there anyway, not controlled by the left in Moscow.

In an interview with the Spanish daily El País, a nephew of a Republican soldier at the Battle of Brunete explained that she had died in an accident. According to the eye-witness account, she had been run over by a reversing tank and she died from her wounds in El Goloso English hospital a few hours later. The tank driver did not realize what he had done.

Due to her political commitment, Taro had become a respected anti-fascist figure. On 1 August 1937, on what would have been her 27th birthday, the French Communist Party gave her a grand funeral in Paris, drawing tens of thousands of people on to the streets, buried her at Père Lachaise Cemetery, and commissioned Alberto Giacometti to create a monument for her grave.

In early 2018, a photograph purported to be an image of Taro on her deathbed in the English war hospital was released by the son of the Hungarian physician, Dr Kiszely, who treated her.

Legacy
On 26 September 2007, the International Center of Photography opened the first major U.S. exhibition of Taro's photographs.

In October 2008, the City of Stuttgart named a square at the intersection of Hohenheimer, Dannecker and Alexander Strasse after Taro: the Gerda-Taro-Platz. The square was redesigned in 2014, with an inauguration ceremony on 18 November, to include 9 metal steles, each with one letter of her name cut out, visible from a distance.

In the summer of 2016 an open-air display of Taro's Spanish Civil War photographs was part of the f/stop photography festival in Leipzig. When the festival ended, it was decided the display, partly paid for by crowdfunding, would become permanent. Shortly after, on 4 August, the display of Taro's work was destroyed by smearing it with black paint. With a crowdfunding project to restore the work ongoing, the destroyed work remains in place. It is suspected the destruction is motivated by anti-refugee or anti-semitic sentiments.

The novel Waiting for Robert Capa, by Susana Fortes (2011 – English translation by Adriana V. López), is a fictionalized account of the life of Taro and Capa.

The documentary film, The Mexican Suitcase (2011), tells the story of a suitcase of 4,500 lost negatives taken by Taro, Capa and David Seymour during the Spanish Civil War. The suitcase, and the negatives, are currently housed at the International Center of Photography in New York City. The stage play Shooting With Light, produced by theater company Idle Motion, is based on this film. In sorting through the works of this collection, many photographs once attributed to Capa were found to be Taro's, thus allowing a greater understanding of her contribution to photojournalism. Describing one difference in her style as compared to that of Capa, curator Kristen Lubben said "Her pictures are much more posed, using strong camera angles. Capa was much more into movement."

The British indie rock band alt-J's song "Taro" is about her role as a war photographer during the Spanish Civil War as well as her relationship to Capa. The song describes the graphic details of Capa's death ("A violent wrench grips mass / Rips light, tears limbs like rags") and imagines Taro's complementary emotions.

In 2017 the City Council of Madrid decided to name a street in the city Calle Gerda Taro (Gerda Taro Street), a street running from Avenida de la Victoria to Calle Durango; it is located northwest from the city center along the route A6.

The city of Paris did the same in 2019 with the new Rue Gerda Taro, in the 13th arrondissement, by unanimous vote of the political groups of the Council of Paris.

In 2018, the city of Leipzig named a new gymnasium for 1,200 students after Taro; it is near the display of her photographs on permanent exhibition.

She was highlighted on Google's Doodle on August 1, 2018.

In 2017 she was the subject of the novel The Girl with the Leica, by Helena Janeczek.

In the 2022 International Center of Photography exhibition, "Death in the Making: Reexamining the Iconic Spanish Civil War Photobook," new revelations and significance about Gerda Taro's contribution to Robert Capa's photobook, "Death in the Making," are highlighted.

In 2023 she was the subject of the verse novel, One Last Shot, by Kip Wilson.

Exhibitions 
Death in the Making: Reexamining the Iconic Spanish Civil War Photobook, September 29, 2022-January 9, 2023, International Center of Photography, New York, NY.

Publications

References
Notes

Further reading

External links

 "International Center of Photography Holds First Major Exhibition of Taro's Work", The New York Times, 22 September 2007.
 "Exhibition – Gerda Taro – This is War exhibition at the Barbican", Magnum Photos, 2008.

1910 births
1937 deaths
Jewish emigrants from Nazi Germany to France
War photographers
War photographers killed while covering military conflicts
Women war correspondents
German people of the Spanish Civil War
Burials at Père Lachaise Cemetery
Journalists killed while covering the Spanish Civil War
German Anti-Francoists
German expatriates in France
German expatriates in Spain
German photojournalists
German women photographers
Women in the Spanish Civil War
20th-century German women artists
20th-century German women writers
20th-century German photographers
Jewish women writers
Spanish Civil War photographers
20th-century women photographers
Women photojournalists